Tamara Maria Oynick (born 28 March 1953) is a Mexican former breaststroke and medley swimmer. She competed in four events at the 1968 Summer Olympics.

She competed in the 1965 Maccabiah Games in Israel, winning a silver medal in the 200 m breaststroke  behind Israeli Shlomit Nir, a future Olympian.

References

External links
 

1953 births
Living people
Competitors at the 1965 Maccabiah Games
Jewish swimmers
Maccabiah Games medalists in swimming
Mexican female breaststroke swimmers
Mexican female medley swimmers
Maccabiah Games silver medalists
Olympic swimmers of Mexico
Swimmers at the 1968 Summer Olympics
Swimmers at the 1967 Pan American Games
Pan American Games competitors for Mexico
Swimmers from Mexico City
Central American and Caribbean Games gold medalists for Mexico
Central American and Caribbean Games medalists in swimming
Competitors at the 1966 Central American and Caribbean Games